Chancellor of the Exchequer is a 1983 business simulation video game published by Mach-Ina Strategy Games for the Atari 8-bit family

Gameplay

Chancellor of the Exchequer is a game in which the player must develop Britain's economy of 1805 while the nation is in chaos.

Reception
Stewart MacKames reviewed the game for Computer Gaming World, and stated that "In the final analysis, Chancellor of the Exchequer will succeed or fail as a game you would like, based upon your enjoyment of economic simulations. Judged as such, the quality of the simulation and the challenge to your ability to succeed greatly out weigh any of its negative aspects."

Reviews
Computer Gaming World - Oct, 1990

References

External links
Review in ST.Game
Review in Antic
Review in ANALOG Computing
Review in ROM magazine

1983 video games
Atari 8-bit family games
Atari 8-bit family-only games
Business simulation games
Government simulation video games
Video games set in the 19th century
Video games developed in the United States
Video games set in the United Kingdom